Totally Australia is an Australian children's documentary television series aired on Network Ten in 1997 until 2008 at 6am.

Network 10 original programming
Australian children's television series
1990s Australian documentary television series
1997 Australian television series debuts
2008 Australian television series endings
Television series by Endemol Australia
2000s Australian documentary television series